Hazen School District  is a school district in Prairie County, Arkansas, headquartered in Hazen. In addition to Hazen, it includes DeValls Bluff, Fredonia (Biscoe), and Ulm. The mascot is the hornet, and it has two schools: Hazen High School and Hazen Elementary School.

The DeValls Bluff School District consolidated into the Hazen district on July 1, 2006.

References

External links
 
 
School districts in Arkansas
Education in Prairie County, Arkansas